Wonderful Times (literally Narrate) is a Czech retro television series. It was produced by Dramedy Productions, whose producers Filip Bobiňski and Petr Šizling created the series with screenwriter Rudolf Merkner. The plot takes place in Czechoslovakia (later in the Czech Republic) and is set in real historical events that influence the stories of individual characters. Authors wanted to evoke atmosphere of the time with excerpts from Czechoslovak film weeklies of the time with original comments, by new historicizing commentary narrated by Vladimír Fišer, or by period music. The story is accompanied by the voice of the narrator, who was lent to the project by the actor Vojtěch Kotek and then by Matěj Hádek. The series was a large success and is considered one of the most successful projects of Czech Television.

Plot
The plot is told by Honza Dvořák, who is trying to record the history of his family, based on the stories of his parents and grandparents.

The opening scene takes place in the present, at the wedding of Honza and Lucie - the daughter of Honza's father Karel's lifelong enemy - Jarda France. The plot of the series is gradually moving towards this wedding again.

Cast
Nina Divíšková as Alžběta Dvořáková
Radoslav Brzobohatý as František Kopecký
Svatopluk Skopal as Josef Dvořák
Veronika Freimanová as Jana Dvořáková
Roman Vojtek as Karel Dvořák
Andrea Kerestešová as Eva Dvořáková née Martináková
Štěpán Tesáček/Jakub Pozler/Oliver Sieber/Marián Mikš/Zdeněk Piškula/Jiří Novák/Braňo Holiček/Matěj Hádek as Jan "Honza" Dvořák
Jakub Sehnalík/Filip Antonio/Štěpán Krtička/Štěpán Benoni as Matěj Dvořák
Jaromír Nosek as Antonín Sova ml.
Andrea Nováková/Hana Vagnerová as Zuzana Sovová née Dvořáková
Kateřina Císařovská/Anastázie Chocholatá/Lucie Šteflová as Magdalena Sovová
Petr Pěknic as Dan Kolář 
David Prachař as Radim Dvořák
Mahulena Bočanová as  Milada Dvořáková
Lenka Zahradnická as Renata Dvořáková
Martin Zounar as Oto Slaný AKA Slaňoch
Oldřich Hajlich as Roman Dvořák
Eva Zubíčková as Marika Dvořáková née Růžičková
František Šmirous / Matěj Švehla as Viktor Dvořák
Pavel Trávníček as Mikuláš Dvořák
Johana Munzarová as Hilda Dvořáková
Lenka Ouhrabková as Julie
Judita Jansman as Anna
Dana Syslová as Marie Sovová
Oldřich Vlach as Antonín Sova senior
Marián Labuda as Janko Martinák
Marta Sladečková as Maria Martináková
Zuzana Čapková as Jana Oplatková née Martináková
Ladislav Hampl as Marek Oplatka 
Milena Minichová as Katarína Kupsová née Martináková
Josef Polášek as Hynek Kupsa

Episodes

References

External links
Official website

2009 Czech television series debuts
Czech Television original programming
Czech drama television series